Keith Wolahan is an Australian Liberal Party politician. He is currently a Member of the House of Representatives for the seat of Menzies, to which he was first elected at the 2022 Federal Election. Having served in the armed forces as a commando, alongside a career as a lawyer and barrister, Wolahan was elected to the Parliament of Australia on 21 May 2022.

Early life

Family background 
As a ten-year-old boy, Wolahan's family emigrated to Australia from Ireland, making their home in Melbourne, Victoria. He became an Australian citizen in 1993. He was educated at local public schools, including Ringwood Secondary College where he became a School Captain. He worked at McDonald's in Eastland, Ringwood from 1994 to 1997, while attending school.

Education and legal career 
He studied at the University of Melbourne where he graduated with Bachelor degrees in arts and commerce. Wolahan continued studying at Monash University, completing a Bachelor of Law (Honours). Participating in Moot court trials was a strong interest, for which he was recognised with the Charles Lowe Moot Prize. His honours thesis was titled "Defence, Justice & the War on Terror".

Wolahan began his career in law with the national firm, Mallesons Stephen Jacques where he specialised in mergers and acquisitions. In a podcast interview on Lawyer's Weekly, Wolahan admitted that he hadn't enjoyed corporate law, moving to litigation because he enjoyed advocacy. In 2010 he became a barrister, specialising in commercial and consumer matters. In his years at the bar, he acted on some high-profile matters, acting for Glencore in the Victorian Supreme Court, also in the successful defence of two commandos accused of war crimes.

In 2013, Wolahan graduated from University of Cambridge with a master's degree in International Relations.

Military service 
When asked why he had joined the military, Wolahan explained that "Australia had been very good to me and my family, and I couldn't think of a better way to give back." He began his service at University, continuing with the Australian Army Reserve, eventually joining 2 Commando Company, 1st Commando Regiment. Wolahan was promoted to Captain in 2004 and saw seven periods of active service, including four postings overseas with 2 Commando:

 Timor-Leste 2007 for six months as the liaison officer for the Apprehension Task Group following the Battle of Same.
 Afghanistan 2008 for six months as the Operations Officer with the Special Operations Task Group HQ in Kandahar with responsibilities for planning operations conducted by the SAS and Commandos. 
 Afghanistan 2009–10 for six months as a Platoon Command within the Special Operations Task Group HQ based in Tarinkot. Wolahan lead intelligence operations, and Joint Prioritized Effects List missions, sometimes involving 80 troops. 
 Afghanistan 2014 for four months as the Deputy Chief of Operations with United States Special Operations Command based in Bagram. Much of the work of this group involved targeted drone led operations and logistics tasks.

Wolahan lost two friends in the War in Afghanistan: Marcus Case and Greg Sher. As he commenced his political career, he joined two other Afghanistan veterans in the Australian Parliament: Andrew Hastie and Phillip Thompson.

Political career

Preselection

Wolahan was announced as the Liberal Party candidate to run in the 2022 federal election in the seat of Menzies, an ethnically diverse part of Melbourne where two-thirds of people have one parent born overseas. Strong support from the local membership saw Wolahan defeat the sitting member Kevin Andrews in the contest, 181 votes to 111. Significantly, Andrews had the support of Treasurer Josh Frydenberg, though not of Prime Minister Scott Morrison. It was the first time a sitting Victorian Liberal MP had been ousted by their members in more than 20 years. Wolahan's preselection was considered a "generational change" for the Liberal Party and it was a "rare" event for politicians to not retain their seats.

2022 election

The 2022 federal election saw a 6% swing against the Liberals in Menzies, with votes counted days afterwards. On 28 May 2022, Wolahan's lead grew insurmountable and he declared victory in the seat.

In a response to the Liberal Party's defeat in the 2022 election, Wolahan said "the Morrison government’s rhetoric on China contributed to the party’s defeat at the election by fuelling discontent among Chinese-Australian voters".  Wolahan stated that he had raised his concern with members of cabinet and was told concerns about China referred to the government, not its citizens.

Views

Conservatism 
Wolahan has rejected suggestions he is aligned with the moderate ideological faction of the Liberal Party. A supporter of federalism, Wolahan has noted his focus as member of parliament is on economic and national security issues, leaving social change a matter to be dealt with by state parliaments.

In a talk given to the Samuel Griffith Society in 2017, Wolahan expressed his opposition to an Indigenous Voice to Parliament, and called instead for “minimalist” reforms that “removes race from the Constitution”.

Wars in Iraq and Afghanistan 
When asked about his views on the war in Iraq, in which Australia participated, Wolahan called the invasion by the United States-led coalition a "mistake". Though he says leading a platoon in Afghanistan has been his "greatest honour", Wolahan has urged "truth telling over myth making."

Personal life 
Wolahan is married to his wife Sarah and has two children, Leo and Eva. He and Sarah were married at Heide Museum of Modern Art.

Honours and awards

References 

Australian barristers
University of Melbourne alumni
Liberal Party of Australia politicians
Living people
1977 births
Irish emigrants to Australia
Members of the Australian House of Representatives
Recipients of the Commendation for Distinguished Service
Politicians from County Dublin